A social union is the integration of social policy among several nations or states.

Social Union may also refer to:
Canada's social union, and its Social Union Framework Agreement
Christian Social Union (disambiguation)
German Social Union (disambiguation), various meanings
The National Social Union
The Social Union, a political party in Hungary

See also
Social unionism, or Social Movement Unionism